The Pacific Rugby League International is a rugby league test match that has been played between two Pacific Island nations during the National Rugby League's annual representative weekend since 2013. The fixture was held at Penrith Stadium for the 2013 and 2014 test matches. In 2015, two fixtures were held; Samoa and Tonga competed for the Polynesian Cup while Fiji and Papua New Guinea competed for the Melanesian Cup at Cbus Super Stadium. In 2016 the fixtures returned to New South Wales and were held at Parramatta's Pirtek Stadium.

In August 2015, the NRL announced a new $925 million (Australian) TV deal. As part of the deal it was announced that the Pacific test matches would continue to be televised until at least 2022 and will be played on the Sunday before game 2 of the State of Origin series. The deal begins in 2018.

Match summaries

2010 tests

2013 test

The 2013 Pacific Rugby League test was played between Samoa and Tonga. The fixture was created as a warm-up international for their 2013 Rugby League World Cup campaigns. Tonga won the test match 36–4. Tonga's Samisoni Langi won the man of the match award, after scoring 16 points from two tries and four conversions.

Controversy occurred late in the match as the game had to be called off before Langi had the chance to convert the final try due to fans invading the pitch.

Both teams selected a number of débutantes, with the most experienced players only appearing between 3-8 times. The most experienced players that played in the test match were Tonga's Richard Fa'aoso and Etu Uaisele who both made 8 appearances for their country before this test match. Samoa's most experienced player was Ben Roberts who made 3 appearances before this test match. All players were contracted to NRL clubs (though some were still playing in the NYC, except for Tongan winger Etu Uaisele who played for the Wyong Roos in the New South Wales Cup.

2014 test

The 2014 Pacific Rugby League test was played between Samoa and Fiji. The fixture was a qualifier for the 2014 Four Nations. Samoa won the test match by 32–16 after being behind 16–12 at half-time. Samoa's Penani Manumalealii won the man of the match award, scoring 3 tries in the match.

Samoa picked 7 debutantes for the test match, while Fiji featured three. All of the Samoan team were National Rugby League based players, while the Fijian side had 10 players from the NRL. Samoa's most capped player was Daniel Vidot who made his 6th appearance for his country, while Fiji's most experienced players were Alipate Noilea, Aaron Groom, and captain Ashton Sims who all made their 10th appearance for their nation.

Aftermath

After the test match, Petero Civoniceva said that "Test matches between emerging nations is a necessity for the game to grow outside of Australia, New Zealand and England".

Due to the win, Samoa had qualified for the 2014 Four Nations. Samoa lost all three matches, losing to England 26–32 at Suncorp Stadium in Brisbane on the tournament's opening day double header, New Zealand 12–14 at Toll Stadium in Whangarei, and then finally to Australia 18–44 at Win Stadium in Wollongong.

2015 tests

On 24 December 2014 it was announced that Papua New Guinea would play Fiji and Samoa would play Tonga as part of a 2015 Pacific test double header. The 2015 Melanesian Cup was played between Papua New Guinea and Fiji.

Fiji beat Papua New Guinea to win the inaugural Melanesian Cup title. Fiji never looked like losing the match after an easy first half performance, leading 18–0 at the break. They went on to win the test match by 22–10. Fiji's Marika Koroibete won the man of the match award, scoring 2 tries in the match. Papua New Guinea's defeat means that they still haven't won a test-match on away soil since the 2000 Rugby League World Cup.

Fiji picked 6 débutantes for the test match, while PNG also featured six players making their first ever International appearance for their country. Both teams had a fair share of NRL, Queensland or New South Wales Cup, as well as domestic club players. Papua New Guinea's most capped players were Nene MacDonald, Ray Thompson, and Tyson Martin who all made their 4th appearance for their country, while Fiji's most experienced player was their captain Jason Bukuya who made his 10th appearance for his country.

PNG Hunters' Israel Eliab captained Papua New Guinea, and Cronulla's Jason Bukuya led Fiji.

Aftermath

On October 17, Tonga had a one-off battle with the Cook Islands in the Asia-Pacific qualifying playoff for the 2017 Rugby League World Cup. The Tongans only led by 4 at the break before running away in the second half scoring 3 tries in the last 20 minutes of the game.

Before the game Tongan coach, Kristian Woolf, mentioned how players being eligible for second-tier nations such as Tonga and Samoa are being unfairly punished if they pursue an opportunity with an Australian or New Zealand Test or Origin squad. He made this recent complaint after Tongan internationals Sio Siua Taukeiaho and Tuimoala Lolohea went off to play for the Kiwis in their end-of-year test series against England. This now means that Tonga can't pick these two players until a 2-year period has passed. Woolf said "Some flexibility in those rules would certainly help in terms of helping your tier two nations becoming more competitive with your first-tier nations."

2016 tests

Another Pacific Island nation that does not compete in these matches, Cook Islands, organised a test match with Lebanon at Belmore Sports Ground on May 8.

The 2016 Melanesian Cup was played between Papua New Guinea and Fiji.
Papua New Guinea created history to win their first Melanesian Cup title. The test looked in a similar situation to last year when Fiji took a comfortable lead into the break but this time around Papua New Guinea scored enough points in the second half to outscore their pacific rivals and win their first major title since the 2009 Pacific Cup. Captain David Mead shone for the Kumuls as he made try-saving tackles, assists and even line breaks in a man-of-the-match performance which was a crucial influence to earning his country's first win on away soil since the year 2000.
Fiji picked 7 débutantes for the test match, while PNG featured five players making their first ever International appearance for their country. Both teams had a fair share of NRL, Queensland or New South Wales Cup, as well as domestic club players. Papua New Guinea's most capped player was Rod Griffin who made his 10th appearance for his country, while Fiji's most experienced player was Akuila Uate who made his 12th appearance for his country.
Gold Coast's David Mead captained Papua New Guinea, and Port Kembla Blacks' James Storer led Fiji.

The 2016 Polynesian Cup was played between Samoa and Tonga.
Samoa defeated Tonga to win their second consecutive Polynesian Cup title. The strong crowd would always show their passion and loud screaming support throughout the game after big hits, strong runs and intense moments were key talking points. However a total of 29 errors and a completion rate of just over 50% from both countries was a headache for everyone to watch. Despite Tonga having 55% possession and more territory, they didn't score and the Samoans made them pay by taking their few second-half opportunities that were given to them resulting in another Samoan victory over their old 'War rivals'.
Samoa picked 7 débutantes for the test match, while Tonga featured three. Both teams' players varied from National Rugby League players to Queensland or New South Wales Cup to Holden Cup and to the Super League. Samoa's most capped player was Leeson Ah Mau who made his 10th appearance for his country, while Tonga's most experienced player was Feleti Mateo who made his 13th appearance for his country.
English Super League club Hull F.C. gave permission for two players to leave England and play in the Polynesian Cup test; coincidentally they were captain of both nations.  Frank Pritchard captained Samoa, and Sika Manu led Tonga.

Aftermath

A couple of hours before the Pacific test-matches began, discussions were made and confirmed between the RLIF Deputy Chairman, John Grant, alongside Rugby League Samoa Chairman/Asia-Pacific Rugby League Confederation Chairman, Tagaloa Faafouina Su'a, and the Fiji Rugby League Chairman, Filimoni Vosarogo, that Samoa's city of Apia will host a test-match between Samoa and Fiji on October 8, 2016. This test-match will mark 30 years of Rugby league in Samoa.

2017 tests

2018 tests

2019 tests

2020 tests

The 2020 series was cancelled due to the COVID-19 pandemic.

2022 tests

See also

Pacific Cup (1975–2009)
Oceania Cup (2019–)

References

 
International rugby league competitions hosted by Australia
Oceanian rugby league competitions
2013 in rugby league
2014 in rugby league
2015 in rugby league
2016 in rugby league
2017 in rugby league
2018 in rugby league
Rugby league in Tonga
Rugby league in Samoa
Rugby league in Fiji